Opeth is a Swedish progressive death metal band from Stockholm. Formed in 1990, the group originally featured vocalist David Isberg, guitarists Micke Bargström and Dan Nilsson, bassist Martin Persson, and drummer Rille Even. Isberg reformed the band the following year with Mikael Åkerfeldt, who would later take over as frontman in 1992. The current lineup of Opeth features Åkerfeldt on guitars and lead vocals, Martín Méndez on bass (since 1997), Fredrik Åkesson on guitars and backing vocals (since 2007), Joakim Svalberg on keyboards and backing vocals (since 2011), and Waltteri Väyrynen on drums (since 2022).

History

1990–2003
David Isberg formed Opeth in 1990 with Micke Bargström, Dan Nilsson, Martin Persson and Rille Even. During an early rehearsal, Isberg brought in Mikael Åkerfeldt to replace Persson on bass without informing the rest of the band, all of whom he fired following the event. The remaining pair of Isberg and Åkerfeldt completed the second lineup of Opeth with the addition of guitarist Andreas Dimeo, bassist Nick Döring and drummer Anders Nordin. Dimeo and Döring both left after the band's first show in February 1991, with Kim Pettersson and Johan De Farfalla (both members of local "sleazy metal" band Crimson Cat) taking their places. De Farfalla left after the group's second show, with Peter Lindgren joining on bass for a third performance later in the year, after which Petterson left and Lindgren switched to guitar. Founding frontman Isberg also left Opeth in early 1992 due to "creative differences". Åkerfeldt later recalled that "at the time, I thought [Isberg's departure] was good for the band, as he no longer seemed as interested as the rest of us".

Following Isberg's departure, Åkerfeldt took over as the lead vocalist of Opeth, and writing for a debut studio album began with Lindgren and Nordin. After a period as a three-piece, Mattias Ander briefly joined as the group's bassist, before Stefan Guteklint joined later in the year. Guteklint was fired by Åkerfeldt and Lindgren just over a year later, with former bassist De Farfalla returning for the recording of the group's debut album Orchid. After a tour in promotion of the group's second album Morningrise in 1996, Åkerfeldt and Lindgren fired De Farfalla without consulting Nordin, which also led to him leaving. Opeth briefly considered breaking up, before bringing in drummer Martin Lopez and later bassist Martín Méndez; bass on 1998's My Arms, Your Hearse was recorded by Åkerfeldt, as Méndez had joined too late to contribute.

Since 2003
After the release of Damnation in 2003, which marked a change in the band's musical style to a more keyboard-heavy progressive rock-influenced sound, Opeth added Per Wiberg as a touring keyboardist. He later became an official member of the band in 2005. After suffering a string of stress-related illnesses and panic attacks, Lopez ceased performing with Opeth in August 2005, with Martin "Axe" Axenrot filling for a number of tours. By the following May the regular drummer had officially left the band, with Axenrot officially taking his place. Lindgren left the group a year later, stating that he had "lost some of the enthusiasm and inspiration needed to participate in [the] band". He was replaced by Fredrik Åkesson. In April 2011, it was announced that Wiberg had left the band. He was replaced by Joakim Svalberg.

The lineup of Åkerfeldt, Åkesson, Méndez, Axenrot and Svalberg remained stable for ten years, before it was announced in November 2021 that Axenrot had left the band due to a "conflict of interests". He was replaced for upcoming tour dates by Therion's Sami Karppinen.

Members

Current

Former

Timeline

Lineups

References

External links
Opeth official website

Opeth